Unionicolidae is a family of prostigs in the order Trombidiformes. There are about 5 genera and at least 40 described species in Unionicolidae.

Genera
 Huitfeldtia Thor, 1898
 Koenikea Wolcott, 1900
 Najadicola Piersig, 1897
 Neumania Lebert, 1879
 Unionicola Haldeman, 1842

References

Further reading

 
 
 
 

Trombidiformes
Acari families